Batang Kankaloo – Caloocan, also known as Batang Kankaloo-Koolers is a professional basketball team in the Maharlika Pilipinas Basketball League and the Pilipinas Super League. It is owned by the city government of Caloocan.

The team was previously sponsored by Victory Liner, Inc.

History
In 2017, the Supremos formally joined the MPBL as one of 10 charter teams when the league began play in 2018. In 2021, the team changed their name to Caloocan Excellence. When they joined the Pilipinas Super League in 2022, they changed their name once more as the Batang Kankaloo.

Team roster

Head coaches

Season-by-season records
Records from the 2021 MPBL Invitational:

References

2017 establishments in the Philippines
Basketball teams established in 2017
 
Sports teams in Metro Manila
Maharlika Pilipinas Basketball League teams